The Volzhsky constituency (No.84) is a Russian legislative constituency in Volgograd Oblast. Until 2007 the constituency covered rural districts in northeastern Volgograd Oblast as well as the city of Volzhsky, however, after 2015 redistricting the constituency was extended southwards to urban Volgograd.

Members elected

Election results

1993

|-
! colspan=2 style="background-color:#E9E9E9;text-align:left;vertical-align:top;" |Candidate
! style="background-color:#E9E9E9;text-align:left;vertical-align:top;" |Party
! style="background-color:#E9E9E9;text-align:right;" |Votes
! style="background-color:#E9E9E9;text-align:right;" |%
|-
|style="background-color:"|
|align=left|Valery Nikitin
|align=left|Independent
|
|21.71%
|-
| colspan="5" style="background-color:#E9E9E9;"|
|- style="font-weight:bold"
| colspan="3" style="text-align:left;" | Total
| 
| 100%
|-
| colspan="5" style="background-color:#E9E9E9;"|
|- style="font-weight:bold"
| colspan="4" |Source:
|
|}

1995

|-
! colspan=2 style="background-color:#E9E9E9;text-align:left;vertical-align:top;" |Candidate
! style="background-color:#E9E9E9;text-align:left;vertical-align:top;" |Party
! style="background-color:#E9E9E9;text-align:right;" |Votes
! style="background-color:#E9E9E9;text-align:right;" |%
|-
|style="background-color:"|
|align=left|Aleksandr Kulikov
|align=left|Communist Party
|
|31.03%
|-
|style="background-color:"|
|align=left|Aleksandr Sharonov
|align=left|Independent
|
|8.45%
|-
|style="background-color:"|
|align=left|Vyacheslav Molchanov
|align=left|Independent
|
|8.28%
|-
|style="background-color:"|
|align=left|Vladimir Mironenko
|align=left|Yabloko
|
|8.13%
|-
|style="background-color:"|
|align=left|Vladimir Kontemirov
|align=left|Independent
|
|7.52%
|-
|style="background-color:#E98282"|
|align=left|Tatyana Kandaurova
|align=left|Women of Russia
|
|6.55%
|-
|style="background-color:#019CDC"|
|align=left|Mikhail Kulapov
|align=left|Party of Russian Unity and Accord
|
|5.44%
|-
|style="background-color:#FF4400"|
|align=left|Igor Bugayenko
|align=left|Party of Workers' Self-Government
|
|5.04%
|-
|style="background-color:"|
|align=left|Vladimir Tuayev
|align=left|Independent
|
|3.86%
|-
|style="background-color:#2C299A"|
|align=left|Aleksandr Sherstyuk
|align=left|Congress of Russian Communities
|
|2.51%
|-
|style="background-color:"|
|align=left|Roman Rastegayev
|align=left|Independent
|
|2.02%
|-
|style="background-color:#1C1A0D"|
|align=left|Valentin Korinets
|align=left|Forward, Russia!
|
|1.59%
|-
|style="background-color:#295EC4"|
|align=left|Sergey Dubinin
|align=left|Party of Economic Freedom
|
|0.86%
|-
|style="background-color:"|
|align=left|Nikolay Smirnov
|align=left|Independent
|
|0.84%
|-
|style="background-color:#000000"|
|colspan=2 |against all
|
|6.04%
|-
| colspan="5" style="background-color:#E9E9E9;"|
|- style="font-weight:bold"
| colspan="3" style="text-align:left;" | Total
| 
| 100%
|-
| colspan="5" style="background-color:#E9E9E9;"|
|- style="font-weight:bold"
| colspan="4" |Source:
|
|}

1999

|-
! colspan=2 style="background-color:#E9E9E9;text-align:left;vertical-align:top;" |Candidate
! style="background-color:#E9E9E9;text-align:left;vertical-align:top;" |Party
! style="background-color:#E9E9E9;text-align:right;" |Votes
! style="background-color:#E9E9E9;text-align:right;" |%
|-
|style="background-color:"|
|align=left|Aleksandr Kulikov (incumbent)
|align=left|Communist Party
|
|40.96%
|-
|style="background-color:"|
|align=left|Lev Kirichenko
|align=left|Independent
|
|23.43%
|-
|style="background-color:#E98282"|
|align=left|Lidia Budchenko
|align=left|Women of Russia
|
|10.33%
|-
|style="background-color:"|
|align=left|Pavel Kazachenok
|align=left|Independent
|
|4.85%
|-
|style="background-color:"|
|align=left|Andrey Yeremin
|align=left|Independent
|
|3.05%
|-
|style="background-color:"|
|align=left|Anatoly Popov
|align=left|Independent
|
|0.00%
|-
|style="background-color:#000000"|
|colspan=2 |against all
|
|14.48%
|-
| colspan="5" style="background-color:#E9E9E9;"|
|- style="font-weight:bold"
| colspan="3" style="text-align:left;" | Total
| 
| 100%
|-
| colspan="5" style="background-color:#E9E9E9;"|
|- style="font-weight:bold"
| colspan="4" |Source:
|
|}

2003

|-
! colspan=2 style="background-color:#E9E9E9;text-align:left;vertical-align:top;" |Candidate
! style="background-color:#E9E9E9;text-align:left;vertical-align:top;" |Party
! style="background-color:#E9E9E9;text-align:right;" |Votes
! style="background-color:#E9E9E9;text-align:right;" |%
|-
|style="background-color:"|
|align=left|Aleksandr Ageyev
|align=left|United Russia
|
|34.16%
|-
|style="background-color:"|
|align=left|Aleksandr Kulikov (incumbent)
|align=left|Communist Party
|
|32.77%
|-
|style="background-color:"|
|align=left|Aleksandr Tavaldyev
|align=left|Independent
|
|5.25%
|-
|style="background-color:"|
|align=left|Vladislav Popov
|align=left|Independent
|
|4.94%
|-
|style="background-color:"|
|align=left|Anatoly Shiryayev
|align=left|Independent
|
|2.99%
|-
|style="background-color:#7C73CC"|
|align=left|Tazhib Tazhibov
|align=left|Great Russia – Eurasian Union
|
|0.64%
|-
|style="background-color:#000000"|
|colspan=2 |against all
|
|16.68%
|-
| colspan="5" style="background-color:#E9E9E9;"|
|- style="font-weight:bold"
| colspan="3" style="text-align:left;" | Total
| 
| 100%
|-
| colspan="5" style="background-color:#E9E9E9;"|
|- style="font-weight:bold"
| colspan="4" |Source:
|
|}

2016

|-
! colspan=2 style="background-color:#E9E9E9;text-align:left;vertical-align:top;" |Candidate
! style="background-color:#E9E9E9;text-align:left;vertical-align:top;" |Party
! style="background-color:#E9E9E9;text-align:right;" |Votes
! style="background-color:#E9E9E9;text-align:right;" |%
|-
|style="background-color: " |
|align=left|Irina Guseva
|align=left|United Russia
|
|48.58%
|-
|style="background-color:"|
|align=left|Dmitry Litvintsev
|align=left|Liberal Democratic Party
|
|16.39%
|-
|style="background-color:"|
|align=left|Aleksandr Kobelev
|align=left|Communist Party
|
|11.60%
|-
|style="background-color:"|
|align=left|Yekaterina Surova
|align=left|A Just Russia
|
|6.72%
|-
|style="background-color:"|
|align=left|Nonna Tskayeva
|align=left|Communists of Russia
|
|3.05%
|-
|style="background:"| 
|align=left|Aleksandr Yefimov
|align=left|Yabloko
|
|3.02%
|-
|style="background:"| 
|align=left|Dmitry Getmanenko
|align=left|Patriots of Russia
|
|2.06%
|-
|style="background-color: "|
|align=left|Aleksey Sveshnikov
|align=left|Party of Growth
|
|1.67%
|-
|style="background-color:"|
|align=left|Yury Dubovoy
|align=left|The Greens
|
|1.58%
|-
|style="background:"| 
|align=left|Igor Konotopov
|align=left|People's Freedom Party
|
|1.29%
|-
| colspan="5" style="background-color:#E9E9E9;"|
|- style="font-weight:bold"
| colspan="3" style="text-align:left;" | Total
| 
| 100%
|-
| colspan="5" style="background-color:#E9E9E9;"|
|- style="font-weight:bold"
| colspan="4" |Source:
|
|}

2021

|-
! colspan=2 style="background-color:#E9E9E9;text-align:left;vertical-align:top;" |Candidate
! style="background-color:#E9E9E9;text-align:left;vertical-align:top;" |Party
! style="background-color:#E9E9E9;text-align:right;" |Votes
! style="background-color:#E9E9E9;text-align:right;" |%
|-
|style="background-color: " |
|align=left|Oleg Savchenko
|align=left|United Russia
|
|51.55%
|-
|style="background-color:"|
|align=left|Denis Uskov
|align=left|Communist Party
|
|17.89%
|-
|style="background-color:"|
|align=left|Aleksandr Anokhin
|align=left|Liberal Democratic Party
|
|9.76%
|-
|style="background-color:"|
|align=left|Aleksey Vasyutenko
|align=left|A Just Russia — For Truth
|
|7.12%
|-
|style="background-color: "|
|align=left|Dmitry Zaporozhsky
|align=left|New People
|
|3.79%
|-
|style="background-color: "|
|align=left|Anton Kalyuzhny
|align=left|Party of Pensioners
|
|3.61%
|-
|style="background-color:"|
|align=left|Andrey Yuzhmin
|align=left|Rodina
|
|1.73%
|-
|style="background:"| 
|align=left|Anton Getmanenko
|align=left|Yabloko
|
|1.12%
|-
|style="background-color: "|
|align=left|Leonid Semergey
|align=left|Party of Growth
|
|0.99%
|-
| colspan="5" style="background-color:#E9E9E9;"|
|- style="font-weight:bold"
| colspan="3" style="text-align:left;" | Total
| 
| 100%
|-
| colspan="5" style="background-color:#E9E9E9;"|
|- style="font-weight:bold"
| colspan="4" |Source:
|
|}

Notes

References

Russian legislative constituencies
Politics of Volgograd Oblast